Haemodorum simplex is a plant in the Haemodoraceae (blood root) family, native to the south west of  Western Australia, and was first described by John Lindley in 1840.

It is a perennial herb, growing from 0.2-0.65 m high, on clayey and sandy loams, and sands, at swampy sites.

References

simplex
Flora of Western Australia
Taxa named by John Lindley
Plants described in 1840